Leucopogon mitchellii  is a species of flowering plant in the family Ericaceae family and is endemic to  Queensland. It is a shrub with sharply-pointed, narrowly oblong leaves and white, tube-shaped flowers.

Description
The flowers are usually borne singly in leaf axils on a short peduncle, the flowers relatively large for the genus Leucopogon. There are minute bracts at the base of the flower and broad bracteoles less than half as long as the sepals. The style protrudes beyond the petal tube.

Taxonomy
Leucopogon mitchellii was first formally described in 1868 by George Bentham in Flora Australiensis from specimens collected, among others, by Thomas Mitchell near Lake Salvator Rosa.

Leucopogon mitchellii and L. cuspidatus are listed as synonyms of Styphelia mitchellii by Plants of the World Online. The name L. mitchellii is listed as superseded by Styphelia mitchellii by the Queensland Department of Environment and Science, where its conservation status is listed as of "least concern".

Distribution
This species is endemic to Queensland.

References

External links
 Leucopogon mitchellii occurrence data from the Australasian Virtual Herbarium

mitchellii
Ericales of Australia
Flora of Queensland
Taxa named by George Bentham
Plants described in 1868